Fazle may refer to:

Fazle Hasan Abed, KCMG (1936–2019), Bangladeshi social worker, founder and chairman of BRAC
Molla Fazle Akbar, three-star rank Bangladesh Army officer
Fazle Hossain Badsha (born 1952), Bangladeshi politician
A.B.M. Fazle Karim Chowdhury (born 1954), Bangladesh Awami League Member of Parliament
Fazle Haq (1928–1991), Pakistan Army general, martial law administrator of Khyber-Pakhtunkhwa province
Fazle Hussain (born 1943), Professor of Mechanical Engineering and Physics
Fazle Kabir (born 1955), Bangladeshi economist and banker
Fazle Shakoor Khan (born 1976), Pakistani politician from Charsadda
Fazle Lohani (1929–1985), Bangladeshi journalist, television host, songwriter and film producer
Fazle Mahmud (born 1987), first-class and List A cricketer from Bangladesh
Fazle Rabbi Miah (born 1946), Bangladesh Awami League Member of Parliament, deputy speaker of the Bangladeshi parliament
Fazle Kaderi Mohammad Abdul Munim (1924–2001), 4th Chief Justice of Bangladesh, chief of Bangladesh Law Commission
Mohammed Fazle Rabbee (1932–1971), cardiologist and a published medical researcher
Fazle Rabby (born 1997), Bangladeshi cricketer
Sheikh Fazle Noor Taposh (born 1971), Bangladeshi politician
TIM Fazle Rabbi Chowdhury, six-time MP and former leader of the Jatiya Party (Zafar)

See also
Fazle Omar Mosque in Hamburg, the second purpose-built mosque in Germany
Fazl
Fazleh